Monticello, South Carolina is an unincorporated community in Fairfield County, South Carolina, United States.

It is the location of four places listed on the U.S. National Register of Historic Places:
Davis Plantation
Fonti Flora Plantation
Monticello Methodist Church
Monticello Store and Post Office

Notable residents
Jonathan R. Davis, gunfighter
 Gene Richards, former left fielder for the San Diego Padres.

References

Unincorporated communities in Fairfield County, South Carolina
Unincorporated communities in South Carolina